Christopher Atkinson may refer to:

 Christopher Atkinson (missionary) (fl. 1652–1655), early Quaker missionary from Westmorland and one of the Valiant Sixty
 Christopher Atkinson Saville (c. 1738–1819), English merchant and politician

See also 
 Atkinson (surname)